The television and radio rights to broadcast NASCAR on television and radio are one of the most expensive rights of any American sport, with the current television contract with Fox Sports and NBC Sports being worth around .

In the early days of the sport, sports programs like CBS Sports Spectacular and ABC Wide World of Sports would air video highlight packages of NASCAR races. These packages were typically 15 to 30 minutes long that were cut from film of the entire race. This is similar to video packages created by NFL Films. For major races, like the Daytona 500, ABC Sports would show it live for a certain number of laps at the beginning and come back to it to show the end of the race. There had been a few races shown in their entirety in the 1970s, but these were always recorded and shown days or weeks later.

In 1979, CBS Sports televised the entire 1979 Daytona 500 live from start to finish. When ESPN came along in 1981, more races began being shown live in their entirety. Since 1992, all NASCAR races have been shown from start to finish, and all have been shown live since 1997. Until 2001, race tracks struck individual agreements with networks to broadcast races, but NASCAR wanted to capitalize on the growing popularity of the sport and announced in 1999 that television contracts would now be centralized; that is, instead of making agreements with individual tracks, networks would now negotiate directly with NASCAR for the rights to air a package of races.

Television

English language broadcast networks (over-the-air)

Current
 Fox: 2001–2024
 NBC: 1979–1981, 1983–1985, 1999–2006, 2015–2023

Former
 CBS: 1960, 1964, 1975–2000
 ABC: 1961–1992, 1994–2000, 2007–2014

Spanish language networks
 Fox Deportes: 2013–present
 Telemundo: 2015–present
 Universo: 2015–present

English language cable/satellite networks

Current
 FS1: 2013–present
 FS2: 2015–present
 Fox Business Network: 2016–present
 CNBC: 2006, 2015–present
 USA Network: 1982–1985, 2016, 2022–present

Former
 ESPN: 1981–2002, 2007–2014
 ESPN2: 1994–2002, 2007–2014
 ESPN Classic: 2007–2010
 ESPNEWS: 2011–2014
 ESPN Deportes: 2013–2014
 FNN-SCORE: 1988
 Fox Sports Net: 2001
 FX: 2001–2006
 NBCSN: 2015–2021
 Prime: 1990–1991
 Speed: 1998–1999, 2003–2013
 SportsChannel America: 1990
 TBS: 1983–2000
 TNN: 1983, 1986, 1991–2000
 TNT: 2001–2014
 Viewer's Choice: 1988–1990
 Jefferson-Pilot: 1985–1987
 Mizlou: 1982–1985
 MRN TV: 1979–1980
 SETN: 1984–1988

Early years

One of the earliest telecasts of a NASCAR race was the 1960 Daytona 500, parts of which was presented as part of CBS Sports Spectacular, with announcer Bud Palmer.

In the ensuing years, but before 1979, there were three main sources of NASCAR telecasts:
ABC's Wide World of Sports, the sports anthology program, provided coverage of select NASCAR Winston Cup races in the 1970s.  In 1971, it presented a 200-lap race at Greenville-Pickens Speedway in its entirety, the first such broadcast of a NASCAR race.  Throughout the 1970s, ABC presented portions of the Daytona 500, Southern 500, and other important races.
In the late 1970s, CBS Sports Spectacular aired some races; like Wide World of Sports, they were taped and edited.
Car and Track, a weekly auto racing show hosted by Bud Lindemann, recapped all of NASCAR's top-series races in the 1960s and 1970s in a weekly 30-minute syndicated show.

The following table is a list of races from NASCAR's top three series that have been broadcast partially or in their entirety on television during the 1960s.

1979–2000: Flag-to-flag coverage

CBS Sports President Neal Pilson and motor-sports editor Ken Squier believed that America would watch an entire stock car race live on television.  On February 18, 1979, CBS presented the first flag-to-flag coverage of the Daytona 500. Richard Petty won NASCAR's crown-jewel race for the sixth time, but the big story was the post-race fight on the track's infield between Cale Yarborough and Donnie Allison, who crashed together on the final lap while leading. The race drew incredible ratings, in part due to the compelling action both on and off the track, and in part because a major snowstorm on the East Coast kept millions of viewers indoors.

As time passed, more Winston Cup races ended up on TV.  ESPN broadcast its first race in 1981, from North Carolina Motor Speedway (its first live race was later in the year at Atlanta International Raceway), and TNN followed in 1991.  All Cup races were nationally televised by 1985; networks struck individual deals with track owners, and multiple channels carried racing action. Many races were shown taped and edited on Wide World of Sports and syndication services like Mizlou and SETN, but almost all races were live by 1989.  By 2000, the last year of this arrangement, six networks televised at least one Cup series race: CBS, ABC, ESPN, TNN, TBS, and NBC.

Also, a growing number of races in the Busch Grand National Series and NASCAR Truck Series were made available for broadcast, and some track owners even threw in support races in lesser series. Likewise, Winston Cup qualifying aired on ESPN2 or regional sports network Prime Network.

NASCAR wanted to capitalize on its increased popularity even more, so they decided that future deals would be centralized; that is, the networks would negotiate directly with NASCAR for a regular schedule of telecasts.

2001–2006: Fox, NBC, Turner Sports

On December 15, 1999 Fox Sports, FX, NBC and Turner Sports agreed to pay $2.4 billion for a new six-year television package, covering the Winston/Nextel Cup Series and Busch Series schedules.

Fox and FX would be responsible for covering the first half of the season. All Busch Series races during that part of the season would also be on Fox/FX. NBC and Turner would partner to cover the second half of the season, which beginning in 2004 would include the Chase for the Cup. Originally, Turner's broadcast outlet for its NASCAR coverage was to be TBS as it had been for every other race Turner had broadcast before. However, Turner Broadcasting opted to rebrand its sister network TNT as a drama-heavy network and decided to move the NASCAR coverage there in March 2001 as they felt it fit the new branding better.
As part of the new contract, the Daytona events were split evenly between the networks. Fox would air the Daytona 500 in every odd numbered year during the contract, with NBC covering the then-Pepsi 400 those years. NBC would then, in turn, air the Daytona 500 in every even-numbered year with Fox receiving the Pepsi 400.
The network in charge of Daytona 500 coverage would also have the rights to air the events during Speedweeks, which consisted of the Budweiser Shootout, Daytona 500 pole qualifying, the two qualifying races held after pole qualifying, and the season opening Busch race.

ESPN retained the rights to the Truck Series through 2002 under a separate contract.  Beginning in 2003, Speed Channel bought out the rest of ESPN's contract and became the exclusive broadcast home of that series.

Initially, practice and qualifying sessions would alter between Fox Sports Net and FX during the Fox/FX portion of the season and between TNT and CNNSI during the NBC/TNT portion of the season. By the end of 2002, Speed had replaced Fox Sports Net and, due to CNN/SI shutting down in the spring of 2002, a deal was arranged with NBC/TNT to move most practice and qualifying sessions to Speed as well using NBC/TNT's production team and Speed graphics.

The centralized TV deal caused consternation among many longtime NASCAR fans.  The biggest criticisms include an increase in commercial breaks, emphasis on the more popular drivers and teams to the exclusion of others, and the de-emphasis of actual racing coverage in exchange for more fluff and hype.

2007–2014: Fox, ESPN, Turner Sports

Late in 2005, NBC announced that they no longer wanted to carry NASCAR races on their schedule. ABC/ESPN took the opportunity to regain the series. On December 12, 2005, NASCAR announced its next TV contract: eight years, $4.8 billion with Fox/Speed Channel, ABC/ESPN, and TNT. This time, the deal bundled the Truck Series in with the Sprint Cup and Nationwide series:
Fox broadcast the first 13 Cup races along with the Sprint Unlimited every year, and as a result gained exclusivity for the Daytona 500. The package ran through the first weekend in June and (usually) the race at Dover International Speedway. Due to schedule adjustments, the package ended in 2010 with the Coca-Cola 600 and in 2011 with the spring Kansas race.
TNT, which split from former partner NBC, gained rights to six races including the Coke Zero 400 at Daytona. Their coverage began with the June race at Pocono Raceway and continued with the first race of the year at Michigan International Speedway, the lone race at Sonoma Raceway, the Coke Zero 400, and the first race of the year at New Hampshire Motor Speedway. Originally, TNT’s sixth and final race was the race at Chicagoland Speedway, but after that was moved to later in the season TNT picked up the race at Kentucky Speedway. The Coke Zero 400 was presented with limited commercial interruptions until 2013. The Kentucky race replaced the race at Chicagoland Speedway in 2011.
ESPN networks broadcast the remainder of the Cup schedule, beginning at the Brickyard 400; From 2007 to 2009, ABC carried coverage of the last race before the Chase at Richmond and all Chase for the Sprint Cup events, although in 2010 (following NASCAR's shift to standardized start times for races), only three races were aired on ABC, and the majority of coverage was allotted to ESPN networks.
ESPN networks held exclusive rights to the Nationwide Series across the entire season, with races on ESPN, ESPN2, and ABC.
Speed Channel moved two of its Truck Series races to Fox from 2007–09; usually, they were scheduled to be the California race and the spring race at Martinsville. From 2010 to 2013, all CWTS races were on Speed; Fox returned to the series in 2014 with its telecast of the Talladega race.
Qualifying sessions for Sprint Cup races aired on Fox for the Daytona 500, Speed/FS1 for the next 18 races, and alternating between Speed/FS1 and ESPN/ESPN2 for the remaining 17 races.
NASCAR Cup Series practice sessions were broadcast by Speed/FS1 for the first 19 races and alternated between Speed/FS1 and ESPN2 for the remaining 17 races. Speed/FS1 was guaranteed at least one session each weekend during the ESPN portion of the schedule.
Nationwide Series practice and qualifying alternated between Speed/FS1 and ESPN2 throughout the entire season.
On the pay-per-view front, DirecTV premiered NASCAR Hot Pass at the 2007 Daytona 500.  The package consists of four channels, each dedicated to a particular driver with team communications among the driver, crew chief, and spotter. From 2007–08, Hot Pass also had separate lap-by-lap announcers and color commentators for each channel. In 2009 NASCAR Hot Pass became free, although without announcers, and on January 7, 2013, it was discontinued all together.

NBC and FX no longer carried NASCAR as a result. NBC was paying $2.8 billion for six years of Sunday night telecasts of the National Football League starting in 2006. Both the new NFL and old NASCAR deals overlapped in 2006, which forced some postrace coverage at NBC races to air on CNBC. FX stopped airing sporting events from 2006 to 2010. (It did show the ninth inning of a rain-delayed Fox game between the New York Yankees and the Boston Red Sox when it conflicted with the start of the 2008 Subway Fresh Fit 500, as well as other games which overran into the starts of NASCAR races. Beginning in 2010, Fox's MLB games during NASCAR Saturdays were shifted to early in the afternoon.)

The new contracts increased the amount of coverage from each weekend's races.  When the 2007 season began, all practices for NASCAR Cup Series races were televised, whereas only the final practice ("happy hour") was carried before.  In addition, all Nationwide Series final practices and qualifying sessions were also shown; before, a few qualifying sessions were not seen and only a handful of practices were seen. Most, if not all, truck series time trials are also broadcast.

From 2007 to 2010, average race viewership fell from 7.85 million at its height to 5.99 million in 2010, according to the Sports Business Journal.

Starting in 2013, Spanish-language network Fox Deportes airs select NASCAR Cup races either live or delayed.

In August 2013, Speed was replaced by Fox Sports 1, and Fuel TV by Fox Sports 2. All Truck Series races remained on Fox Sports 1, while practice/qualifying sessions and regional series races alternated between Fox Sports 1 and 2 depending on scheduling. For North American markets outside of the United States, coverage of some NASCAR events carried by Speed at the time remained on an international version of Speed (now Fox Sports Racing) that operates in the regions.

In 2014, the Sprint Unlimited moved to Fox Sports 1. Also, owing to the increased viewership of qualifying sessions under the new "group" knockout format, and being the first restrictor plate race under the new system, coverage of qualifying for that year's Aaron's 499 was moved to Fox, marking the only other race besides the Daytona 500 to have a qualifying round televised on broadcast television.

Broadcasters
The broadcast teams for each package during this period are as follows:
Fox retained most of the same announcers that have worked for the network since 2001: Mike Joy, Larry McReynolds, and Darrell Waltrip in the booth, pit reporters Steve Byrnes, Dick Berggren, and Matt Yocum; and prerace hosts Chris Myers and Jeff Hammond.  Krista Voda replaced Jeanne Zelasko as the fourth pit reporter; with the expansion of Fox’s baseball coverage to a full season, Zelasko was no longer available due to her responsibilities as then-studio host.
The ESPN/ABC team: the original team consisted of Jerry Punch as the lead, with Rusty Wallace and Andy Petree as booth analysts. Allen Bestwick moved over from NBC/TNT as the lead pit reporter, joined by fellow former NBC/TNT pit reporter Dave Burns, ESPN’s then-lead NASCAR reporter Mike Massaro, and IndyCar pit reporter Jamie Little. Punch was eventually replaced by Marty Reid as the lead and Dale Jarrett replaced Wallace as an analyst. Bestwick and Wallace were moved to being studio host and analyst for NASCAR Countdown, while Punch moved back into his familiar role as lead pit reporter. Bestwick would later be promoted to replace Reid as the lead broadcaster. 
TNT kept Bill Weber as lap-by-lap announcer and Wally Dallenbach Jr. as analyst.  After some speculation, Kyle Petty was revealed as the second analyst for the network's coverage on February 7, 2007. He continued his role as an active NASCAR driver for two seasons before retiring from driving. Benny Parsons, who was an NBC/TNT analyst, died on January 16, 2007, and it is unclear if he would have returned to the booth in any event, as he had reportedly talked about retirement after 2006 and had personally nominated Petty as his replacement prior to his death. TNT retained its pit crew was well, with Matt Yocum and Marty Snider joined on a permanent basis by former secondary pit reporters Ralph Sheheen and Lindsay Czarniak.  McReynolds, a booth analyst for Fox, is the pre-race analyst. Weber also continued as host of the Countdown to Green pre-race show.  Marc Fein joined McReynolds on a new "pre-pre-race" show called NASCAR on TNT Live.

Bill Weber was forced to leave TNT shortly before the 4th race of TNT's schedule. Officially, Turner says it was due to a personal matter; however USA Today reported that it was due to an incident at a hotel the night before the race. Ralph Sheheen stepped in as announcer for the last 3 races on TNT in 2009. Adam Alexander filled in on pit road for the last 2 races, before moving to the announcer booth for 2010 and beyond. Sheheen returned to pit road, where he remained until the end of TNT's contract. The NASCAR on TNT Live show was discontinued and morphed into an hour-long Countdown to Green which was hosted by Alexander.

2015–2024: Fox and NBC
On October 15, 2012, NASCAR and the Fox Sports Media Group (FSMG) announced a new $2.4 billion eight-year deal, a 30% increase from their previous deal. On July 23, 2013, NASCAR and the NBC Sports Group announced a new $4.4 billion ten-year deal. Ten days later on August 1, 2013, NASCAR and Fox extended and expanded their agreement, paying an additional $1.4 billion to do so, to complete NASCAR's new TV package through the 2024 season. NBC reportedly bid over 50% more than ESPN and Turner for their portion of the package, despite Turner and ESPN expressing interest about continuing their relationship with NASCAR.

NASCAR Cup Series
The first 16 points races will be broadcast by Fox. Ten races, including the Daytona 500, will be broadcast on Fox with six races on FS1.
The final 20 points races, including the NASCAR playoffs, will be broadcast by NBC. Nine races will air on NBC and 11 would air on NBCSN until the end of the 2021 season. NBCSN ceased broadcasting a few weeks later, and their schedule of races would move to USA beginning with the 2022 season.
As part of the deal, Playoff races airing on NBC will be lead-ins to NBC Sunday Night Football (after local news and NBC Nightly News, except for the final race of the season, when SNF follows the race).
The Busch Clash will alternate between Fox (2015–2016) and FS1 (2014, 2017–2024).
The Bluegreen Vacations Duel races, now in primetime, and NASCAR All-Star Race will air on FS1.
Practice and qualifying rights will belong to the network group broadcasting the race.
All races will be live-streamed online.

NASCAR Xfinity Series
The first 14 races will be broadcast by Fox. From 2015 to 2018, four races were broadcast on Fox and the other 10 races aired on FS1, but since 2019 all races air on FS1.
The final 19 races will be broadcast by NBC. Four races (five in 2020) will be broadcast by NBC and the other 15 races (14 in 2020) would air on NBCSN until the end of the 2021 season. NBCSN ceased broadcasting a few weeks later, and their schedule of races will move to USA beginning with the 2022 season.
Practice and qualifying rights will belong to the network broadcasting the race.
All races will be live-streamed online.

Other rights
Fox Sports will continue to be the exclusive broadcasters of the NASCAR Truck Series. All Truck races will also be on the Fox Sports app.
USA Network will also broadcast the ARCA Menards Series East and West, NASCAR Whelen Modified Tour and NASCAR PEAK Mexico Series.
Telemundo and Universo have Spanish-language broadcast rights for national series and Toyota (Mexico) Series events.
 NBC will also have rights to the NASCAR Hall of Fame induction ceremony and season ending banquets.

ESPN and TNT will no longer broadcast NASCAR for the foreseeable future. The new contract succeeded a partnership with Turner Sports and ESPN which it was paid by $4.8 billion that was covered by the previous contract which was eight years that began in 2007.

Historical Race Network Table
Below is a table (1988–present) of each points race and the network upon which it was broadcast (Note: this reflects the networks upon which each race was predominantly shown, and does not reflect in-race movements and pre-emptions due to time constraints or other commitments):

NASCAR Cup Series

Radio

Current broadcasts

Currently, two separate networks cover NASCAR races on radio:
MRN: Founded by Ken Squier and Bill France Jr. in 1971, it covers all NASCAR Cup Series and NASCAR Xfinity Series events at tracks owned by ISC, as well as Dover, Nashville, and Pocono. It also covers all events of the Truck Series.
PRN: Covers all NASCAR Cup Series and Xfinity Series events at tracks owned by Speedway Motorsports (with the exception of former Dover Motorsports tracks) and Circuit of the Americas.
IndyCar Radio Network: Covers the Xfinty Series and NASCAR Cup Series races at the Indianapolis Motor Speedway. It is produced in a joint venture with PRN.

From 2002—2006, all races were heard on XM channel 90 across the continental United States. In 2007, national satellite radio rights moved to Sirius channel 90. Among the programs on Sirius NASCAR Radio are a weekly program co-hosted by TV pit reporter Matt Yocum and Tony Stewart, and a morning drive time show formerly hosted by David Poole of The Charlotte Observer and Marty Snider of NBC and TNT. The Morning Drive is now hosted by MRN turn announcer Mike Bagley and MRN lead writer Pete Pistone. PRN's Jim Noble and Richard Childress Racing Museum curator and former fueler Danny "Chocolate" Myers host the afternoon show called Tradin Paint. Longtime MRN turn announcer Dave Moody hosts SiriusXM Speedway. PRN pit reporter and turn announcer Brad Gillie co-hosts the Late Shift with Kenny Wallace. He's also the regular host of the weekend show Press Pass. Pat Patterson, also PRN turn announcer, hosts the weekend show The Frontstretch.

Following the merger of XM and Sirius, Sirius NASCAR Radio is heard on the XM through the "Best of Sirius" package on channel 90.

Both networks also have affiliation deals with hundreds of local radio stations.  Many stations sign with more than one of these networks to ensure coverage of the entire season.  However, for Indianapolis, if there is a conflict between the INDYCAR Radio affiliate and the radio station that carries NASCAR races, the INDYCAR Radio affiliate has first choice of carrying the race.

International broadcast
In 2020, NASCAR created a worldwide television feed for broadcast outside the United States. Graphics are provided by either Fox Sports or NBCSN depending on who is producing the race in the US. International broadcasters include NTV, TSN, Premier Sports, Sportsnet, The Score, Bell Satellite TV, Speed Latin America, Fox Sports Latin America, DirecTV Sports Latin America, TelevisaUnivision, Fox Sports Australia, AB Moteurs, ESPN America, Eurosport, V Sport Motor, Ziggo Sport Totaal, Sport TV, StarHub, Abu Dhabi Sports, Fox Sports Asia and American Forces Network.

Nascar Trackpass also provides coverage of all Cup and Xfinity Series races for most countries, commercial-free and using NASCAR's worldwide graphics.

Broadcast networks

These are the broadcasters for the 2023 NASCAR season:

Announcers

References

External links
Fox Sports
NBC Sports
RPM.ESPN.com
Motor Racing Network 
Performance Racing Network
Indianapolis Motor Speedway
Sports Media Watch: NASCAR Ratings
Backseat Drivers Fan Council rates the media – how did we do? 
Nascar in HD

 
 
 
History of sports broadcasting
CBS Sports
Fox Sports original programming
NBC Sports
NBCSN
ESPN
ABC Sports
Wide World of Sports (American TV series)
SportsChannel
Turner Sports
USA Network Sports
Mizlou Television Network
Prime Sports
Speed (TV network)
Spike (TV network)
Showtime Networks
Sirius Satellite Radio channels